Immaculata University is a private Roman Catholic university in East Whiteland Township, Pennsylvania. It was founded by the Sisters, Servants of the Immaculate Heart of Mary.

The university is composed of 1,427 traditional undergraduate and adult undergraduate students, and more than 1,000 graduate and doctoral students.

History

Immaculata was founded as Villa Maria College, a women's college in 1920. It was the first Catholic college for women in the Philadelphia area. The name was changed to Immaculata College in 1929.

Founded by the Sisters, Servants of the Immaculate Heart of Mary, Immaculata is part of the greater IHM community, which includes the neighboring House of Studies and an academy for girls (now split into two campuses, Lower School and High School). The university became co-educational in the fall of 2005.

The current location of Immaculata University is a tract of land in Chester County, Pennsylvania, near the "Main Line" in Malvern, purchased by the sisters in 1906. The original  plot has grown to  since that time.

In June 2002, Immaculata College received confirmation of university status from the Pennsylvania Department of Education. Effective August 2002, the college is now known as Immaculata University.

Barbara Lettiere assumed the office as the tenth president of Immaculata University on July 1, 2017, and is the first lay president of Immaculata.

Student life
The Immaculata Leadership Institute is a program which develops religious leadership.

Students can join over 35 clubs and organizations, including:
Campus Ministry- students engage in volunteer and fundraising work to help those less fortunate.
English/Communications Club
IU Gamers' Guild
Garden Club
Cue and Curtain Theater
African-American Cultural Society
Latin Flavor
Fashion Group
Catholic Relief Services Student Ambassadors

Media
The Immaculatan is the student newspaper published with funds from the College of Undergraduate Studies.

The Immaculata Magazine is published twice a year by the staff of University Communications.

Athletics

Varsity Teams: 
Men's Teams

Women's Teams

Conference: Colonial States Athletic Conference (CSAC) through 2017–18; Atlantic East Conference thereafter
Affiliation: NCAA Division III
Nickname: Mighty Macs
Colors: Blue and White

Home Fields
Draper Walsh Stadium (Sprint turf surface) for field hockey, lacrosse, and soccer – 1,000 capacity
IU Softball Field (grass)
IU Baseball Stadium (grass) – 600 capacity

There is a Student-Athlete Advisory Committee (SAAC) which encourages athletics.

Women's basketball
The women's basketball team played in six straight AIAW basketball tournament final fours from 1972 to 1977, five straight finals from 1972 to 1976. They won three consecutive national championships from 1972 to 1974. The team was featured for its 1970s accomplishments on a SportsCenter special on March 23, 2008.

On January 26, 1975, Immaculata played in the first nationally televised women's intercollegiate basketball game. Facing Maryland at Cole Field House, Immaculata won 80–48 in a game noted more for its turnovers (70) than scoring (56 field goals, 16 free throws).

On February 22, 1975, they played in the first women's college basketball game ever played in Madison Square Garden. Immaculata won 65–61. On January 4, 2015, Immaculata and Queens College played in the Maggie Dixon Classic as a commemoration of the 40th anniversary of the first game played between women's college basketball teams in Madison Square Garden.

The story of the basketball team was adapted into a movie, The Mighty Macs, which was released in 2011. Directed by Tim Chambers, the film chronicles the first Mighty Macs championship in 1972.

The head coach of the women's team from 1972 to 1977, Cathy Rush, was inducted into the Naismith Memorial Basketball Hall of Fame in 2008, and the Women's Basketball Hall of Fame in 2010. The 1972–1974 teams were announced on April 7, 2014, as part of the 2014 induction class of the Naismith Hall, and were formally inducted as a team on August 8. Players Theresa Grentz and Marianne Stanley were inducted into the Naismith Hall in 2022 for their subsequent accomplishments as college coaches.

Campus
The following buildings are located on campus:

Alumnae Hall was named in honor of Immaculata University alumnae. This building contains a gymnasium, fitness center, and a theater.

The Mary A. Bruder Center focuses on Campus Health Services (nurses) and Counseling Services.

The DeChantal and Marian halls are a residential complex containing 154 residential rooms with kitchenettes on most floors, student and study lounges, and laundry facilities, as well as a chapel.

The Faculty Center contains faculty and administrative offices of the College of Undergraduate Studies.

The three-storied Gabriele Library contains computers and study rooms and houses the writing center and archives along with a coffee shop on the first level, which is called the ImmacuLatte.

Gillet Hall contains the faculty residences, mainly occupied by the IHM Sisters. The building is named after Father Louis Gillet.

Good Counsel Hall was the university's first main classroom building. It contains a bookstore, humanities department, and music listening rooms.

The Lillian P. Lettiere Center houses financial aid and admissions and also the Esports arena.

Lourdes Hall, attached to Villa Maria Hall, serves as a residential hall with 60 residential rooms and also contains Great Hall for large events and functions.

Loyola Hall is the university's second main classroom building and contains administrative offices—College of Graduate Studies, nursing and allied health sciences, amphitheaters, art, education, mathematics, psychology, science departments, computer centers, curriculum library, laboratories, and math center.
 
Nazareth Hall includes the main cafeteria and the campus chapel. Classrooms are also located in this building for fashion and nutrition majors. In the year 2000, air conditioning, heating, and sprinkler systems were installed.

Villa Maria Hall, with its Italian Renaissance architecture, is a beautiful building capped by a dome. Villa Maria is the principal building of the Immaculata University campus. Ballinger & Perrot designed this building, along with Nazareth Hall. With the vision of the IHM Sisters, Villa Maria Hall was placed between Harrisburg and Philadelphia in order to have a convenient location to build a college for women. It was opened in 1914. In the year 2000, Villa Maria had renovations done. Air conditioning, heating, and sprinkler systems were added to the building. Immaculata events such as Carol Night, Ring Ceremony, Pinning Ceremony, Homecoming, and others are held in this building. The third floor contains a residence hall, while offices are located on the first and second floors. Immaculata University had a post office with a ZIP code of 19345, which is now closed.

In 2022, a new building, the Parsons Science Pavilion, will house the sciences. It will be composed of modern laboratory spaces for chemistry and biology, complete with cutting-edge scientific and simulation equipment.

Alumni

Megan Brennan 1984, first woman to serve as United States Postmaster General
Theresa Grentz 1974, college basketball athlete and coach and member of the Women's Basketball Hall of Fame
E. Gail de Planque 1967, nuclear physicist and first woman to serve as a commissioner of the Nuclear Regulatory Commission
Rene Portland 1975, college basketball athlete and coach for the Penn State Nittany Lions for 27 years
Eileen M. Rehrmann 1997, Maryland state legislator and Harford County executive
Marianne Stanley 1976, athlete and 1984-1985 NCAA Women's Division I Basketball Championship coach

References

External links

 Official website
 Official athletics website

 
Catholic universities and colleges in Pennsylvania
Educational institutions established in 1920
Former women's universities and colleges in the United States
Universities and colleges in Chester County, Pennsylvania
Association of Catholic Colleges and Universities
1920 establishments in Pennsylvania